The Études-Tableaux ("study pictures"), Op. 39 is the second set of piano études composed by Sergei Rachmaninoff.

Structure 
The Op. 39 set comprises nine études:
 Allegro agitato in C minor — No. 1
This quick-paced étude demands a tireless right hand, a syncopated left hand and considerable dexterity. Technically, the music is in an almost continual climax. It bears a resemblance to Chopin's Prelude in E minor.
 Lento assai in A minor — No. 2
Also known as "The Sea and the Seagulls". The work contains many musical textures that make it a difficult study in touch. It requires  performers to restrain themselves and at the same time not sound monotonous. The technical workings of the étude are the 2-over-3 timing, the crossing hands, and large span of the arpeggiated figures for the left hand. This left-hand figure quotes the Dies Irae plainchant, one of the many works by the composer to do so.

 Allegro molto in F minor — No. 3
An incredibly complex étude, tone-wise. While it starts off with an angry, frenetic feel, there are moments of violent sublimity scattered throughout the piece.
 Allegro assai in B minor — No. 4
A charming gavotte, this étude contains a lot of harmonic color.

 Appassionato in E minor — No. 5
Possibly the dramatic peak of both the Op. 33 and Op. 39 sets, it turns passionate, tumultuous, despairing, and somber. It ends on a glimmer of hope, in the parallel major of E major.
 Allegro in A minor — No. 6
This aggressive and daunting piece opens with threatening chromatic octave runs low on the keyboard, answered by quick, chattering treble figures that eventually transform themselves into a march. The music grows hectic and, having reached presto, sounds nearly out of control. The effect of the piece is seemingly mysterious yet fully unified. Referred to as "Little Red Riding Hood and the Wolf", the piece ends with the chromatic runs sounding as though the wolf swallowed Red Riding Hood whole.
This piece was originally the fourth étude of the Op. 33 set. Since it exhibits all the pianistic, rhythmic and harmonic features that characterize the Op. 39 set, it can be assumed Rachmaninoff revised this piece extensively before including it here.
 Lento lugubre in C minor — No. 7
This étude is a lugubrious march that transforms into a cacophonous blaze of the composer's much-loved bell motif at the end.
 Allegro moderato in D minor — No. 8
This piece is a lyrical and musical study of double notes. It requires precise pedaling, flexible and independent fingers, and agility. The piece has very long, defined legato melodic lines that are contrasted by a staccato middle section.
 Allegro moderato. Tempo di marcia in D major — No. 9
A dramatic, bombastic march to conclude this set, this étude contains ingenious counterpoint, lush harmonies, and a wide range of musical colors.

Recordings 

 Rachmaninoff recorded Op. 39, No. 4 (piano roll only), and Op. 39, No. 6 (electrical recording and piano roll).
 Evgeny Kissin recorded Nos. 1,2,4,5,6,9 on the RCA Victor Red Seal label, May 16 and 17, 1988, in Watford Town Hall. 7982-2-RC. The recording also includes the Piano Concerto No. 2, Opus 18, with the London Symphony Orchestra and Valery Gergiev being the conductor.
 Another recording of the Op. 39 Études-Tableaux is by Alexander Melnikov on the Harmonia Mundi label. Other works are the Op. 38 songs and the Variations on a Theme of Corelli.

See also 
 Études-Tableaux, Op. 33

References

Sources 
 Norris, Geoffrey, Rachmaninoff (New York: Schirmer Books, 1976, 1983). .

External links 
 
  Piano.ru – Sheet music download

Performances 
 Études-tableaux, Op 39, played by Boris Giltburg
 Nos. 1-5 by Gintaras Januševičius, recorded in 2011
 Opus 39 played by Igor Gryshyn in Leipzig
 https://www.youtube.com/watch?v=AC7WzWk75EM
 https://www.youtube.com/watch?v=zIGSG6e5T5E
 https://www.youtube.com/watch?v=C0Nodt-Jn-E
 Complete Opus 39 set by Eduardo Fernandez:
 No. 1 in C minor
 No. 2 in A minor
 No. 3 in F minor
 No. 4 in B minor
 No. 5 in E minor
 No. 6 in A minor
 No. 7 in C minor
 No. 8 in D minor
 No. 9 in D major
  Chubrik.ru – Audio download

Piano music by Sergei Rachmaninoff
Rachmaninoff
1917 compositions